Thomas Christie,  (1772/3–1829) was a Scottish physician, notable for his work on the treatment of smallpox in Ceylon.

Life 
Thomas Christie was born at Carnwath, Lanarkshire, in 1772 or 1773. After education in the University of Aberdeen, he entered the service of the East India Company as a surgeon to one of their regiments, and was sent to Trincomalee in 1797. He was made superintendent of military hospitals in 1800, and soon after head of the smallpox hospitals in Ceylon. The systematic introduction of vaccination into the island in 1802 and the general substitution of vaccination for inoculation were effected by Christie. He served in the Candian War of 1803, worked hard for several years at medical improvements in several parts of Ceylon, and returned from the East in February 1810, and immediately proceeded M.D. at Aberdeen.

At the end of the same year Christie became a Licentiate of the College of Physicians, at once began private practice at Cheltenham, and in 1811 published there An Account of the Introduction, Progress, and Success of Vaccination in Ceylon. This, his only book, is based upon official reports and letters written during his residence in Ceylon. In 1799 and 1800, as in many previous years, smallpox raged throughout the island. The natives used to abandon their villages and the sick, and at Errore, Christie found the huts in ruins from the inroad of elephants, bears, and hogs which had trampled down all the fences and gardens, and had eaten the stores of grain and some of the bodies of the dead or dying. Inoculation was practised, but did not check the epidemics, and the native population was averse to it. After some unsuccessful efforts active vaccine lymph was obtained from Bombay, whither it had come from an English surgeon at Baghdad, by way of Bussorah. Christie at once began vaccination, and by continued care and perseverance spread the practice throughout the island, so that by 1806 smallpox only existed in one district, that of the pearl fishery, to which strangers continually reintroduced the disease. In the course of his labours Christie made the original observation that lepers are not exempt from small-pox, are protected by vaccination, and may be vaccinated without danger.

In 1813, through the influence of his friend Sir Walter Farquhar, the physician, Christie was made physician extraordinary to the Prince Regent. He continued to practise at Cheltenham till his death on 11 October 1829.

Works 

He was the author of:

 An Account of the Ravages committed in Ceylon by Small-pox previously to the Introduction of Vaccination: with a Statement of the Circumstances attending the Introduction, Progress, and Success of Vaccine Inoculation in that Island. 8vo. (London, 1811)

See also 

 History of smallpox
 British Ceylon

References

Citations

Bibliography 

 Cordiner, James (1807). A Description of Ceylon. Vol. 1. Vol. 2. London: Longman, Hurst, Rees, and Orme, Paternoster Row; and A. Brown, Aberdeen.
  
 Moore, Norman; Baigent, Elizabeth (2004). "Christie, Thomas (1772/3–1829), physician". In Oxford Dictionary of National Biography. Oxford University Press.
 Munk, William (2020). "Thomas Christie b.1773 d.11 October 1829". Royal College of Physicians. Retrieved 2 April 2022.

1770s births
18th-century Scottish medical doctors
1829 deaths
People from South Lanarkshire